Timothy Daniel Bergland (born January 11, 1965) is an American former professional ice hockey player.

Playing career

Born in Crookston, Minnesota, and raised in Thief River Falls, Minnesota, Bergland was selected by the Washington Capitals in the 1983 NHL Entry Draft, he did not make it onto the Capitals' roster until the 1989–90 season when his defensive play helped guide the Capitals to their first-ever semifinals appearance.

Left exposed in the 1992 NHL Expansion Draft, Bergland was claimed by the Tampa Bay Lightning.  He would have a second tour with the Capitals, albeit briefly, when he was claimed on waivers during the 1993–94 season.

Bergland retired from active play in 1999 after playing several seasons with the Chicago Wolves of the International Hockey League. Played 7 games in Finland during 1997-98 season.

Coaching

Head Coach 1999-2004 Fergus Falls

Assistant Coach 2004-2008 Thief River Falls Prowlers boys hockey team.

Head coach 2008-current Thief River Falls Prowlers boys hockey team.

Career statistics

Regular season and playoffs

International

External links

Profile at hockeydraftcentral.com

1965 births
Living people
People from Crookston, Minnesota
American men's ice hockey right wingers
Atlanta Knights players
Baltimore Skipjacks players
Binghamton Whalers players
Chicago Wolves (IHL) players
Fort Wayne Komets players
HIFK (ice hockey) players
Ice hockey players from Minnesota
Minnesota Golden Gophers men's ice hockey players
People from Thief River Falls, Minnesota
Tampa Bay Lightning players
Washington Capitals draft picks
Washington Capitals players